Ricardo Nicolás Gónzalez Reinoso (born 31 August 1965), known as Richard González and nicknamed as Manteca (Lard), is a retired Chilean footballer who played as a defender during his career. He obtained one cap for the Chilean national side, making his only appearance on 8 September 1993 in a friendly match against Spain.

References

1965 births
Living people
Chilean footballers
Chile international footballers
Association football defenders
1993 Copa América players
Santiago Wanderers footballers
Deportes Temuco footballers
Unión Española footballers
Unión San Felipe footballers
Club Deportivo Palestino footballers
Colo-Colo footballers
Primera B de Chile players
Chilean Primera División players
People from San Felipe, Chile